Franciszek Rogaczewski (23 December 1892 – 11 January 1940) was a Polish Catholic priest who was arrested by the Nazis and killed at Stutthof concentration camp. He is a martyr of the Roman Catholic church, and was beatified by Pope John Paul II on 13 June 1999.

Life
Franciszek Rogaczewski was born on 23 December 1892 in Lipinki, Kujawsko-Pomorskie, Poland. He studied for the priesthood and was ordained in Gdańsk in 1918. As pastor of Christ the King parish, he was a highly renowned and much sought-after confessor. Rogaczewski was arrested on 1 September 1939 by the Nazis for the crime of being a priest. He was tortured for months before being shot to death on 11 January 1940 while imprisoned at Stutthof concentration camp (located near Sztutowo, Poland).

Veneration
After his death, Rogaczewski was recognized as one of the 108 Martyrs of World War II. He was beatified by Pope John Paul II on 13 June 1999. His feast day is 11 January; there is also a group memorial for the 108 Polish Martyrs of World War II whose memorial is celebrated on 12 June.

References

1892 births
1940 deaths
People from Świecie County
20th-century Polish Roman Catholic priests
People who died in Stutthof concentration camp
108 Blessed Polish Martyrs
Polish civilians killed in World War II
Polish people executed in Nazi concentration camps
Executed Polish people
People executed by Germany by firearm
Executed people from Kuyavian-Pomeranian Voivodeship
20th-century venerated Christians